Clochard is a 1932 French comedy film directed by Robert Péguy and starring Georges Biscot and Simone Cerdan. In French the title is a phrase roughly equivalent to tramp.

The film's sets were designed by the art director Robert-Jules Garnier.

Cast
In alphabetical order
 Robert Ancelin as Poum  
 Marcel Barencey as Le président  
 Georges Biscot as Muche  
 Germaine Brière as Madame Caquet  
 Simone Cerdan as Madame Lubin  
 Georges Flateau as Maître Chambourcy  
 Louis Florencie as Bourrache  
 Henri Lemarchand as Firmin  
 René Poyen 
 René Sarvil as Le chanteur des rues  
 Louis Vonelly as Le substitut

References

Bibliography
 Maurice Bessy & Raymond Chirat. Histoire du cinéma français: 1929-1934. Pygmalion, 1988.

External links

1932 films
1932 comedy films
French comedy films
1930s French-language films
Films directed by Robert Péguy
Pathé films
French black-and-white films
1930s French films